Baum is an unincorporated community in Carter County, Oklahoma, United States. The elevation is 722 feet. The town was formerly known as Boland. The post office name was changed to Baum on September 18, 1894 and the office closed on March 15, 1918.

References

Unincorporated communities in Oklahoma